Vincent McNeice (25 October 1938 – 29 August 2022) was an English professional footballer and manager who made over 230 appearances in the Football League for Watford as a centre half. In 1965, he played in the Eastern Canada Professional Soccer League for Hamilton Primos. During his debut season with Hamilton Primos, McNeice was selected to the league's all-star team, which faced Nottingham Forest. He also briefly served as a player-coach for Hamilton Primos before Bill Paterson succeeded him.

McNeice later became a manager and a coach in Denmark, managing B 1903, AaB and one other club, in addition to coaching the reserve team at AGF.

Career statistics

Honours 
Watford

 Football League Fourth Division fourth-place promotion: 1959–60

References 

1938 births
2022 deaths
People from Cricklewood
English footballers
Footballers from the London Borough of Brent
Association football midfielders
English Football League players
Southern Football League players
International Soccer League players
Watford F.C. players
Montreal Concordia players
Canadian National Soccer League players
Bexley United F.C. players
Hamilton Steelers (ECPSL) players
Hillingdon Borough F.C. players
English football managers
Boldklubben 1903 managers
AaB Fodbold managers
Aarhus Gymnastikforening non-playing staff
Eastern Canada Professional Soccer League players
English expatriate football managers
English expatriate sportspeople in Canada
Expatriate soccer players in Canada
English expatriate sportspeople in Denmark
Expatriate football managers in Denmark